Stygiodrina is a genus of moths of the family Noctuidae.

Species
 Stygiodrina maurella (Staudinger, 1888)

References
Natural History Museum Lepidoptera genus database
Stygiodrina at funet

Hadeninae